Adrián Rubio is Mexican actor and model. He studied acting in Centro de Formacion Actoral of TV Azteca.

Filmography

References

External links
 

Living people
Mexican male telenovela actors
People educated at Centro de Estudios y Formación Actoral
Year of birth missing (living people)